Hyposmocoma palmifera is a species of moth of the family Cosmopterigidae. It was first described by Edward Meyrick in 1935. It is endemic to the Hawaiian islands of Oahu and possibly Hawaii. The type locality are the Pauoa Flats.

The larvae have been recorded on Acacia koa (in branches affected with rust galls), Pteralyxia (in dead twigs), Sophora tomentosa (in old pods), Wikstroemia (from dead wood).

External links

palmifera
Endemic moths of Hawaii
Moths described in 1935